is a Japanese actor who is represented by Ken-On.

Biography
Asahi Ito was born in Tokyo, Japan on January 19, 2000.

In 2018 Ito debuted his role as an actor landing his first major role in 2018 Super Sentai series Kaitou Sentai Lupinranger VS Keisatsu Sentai Patranger as Kairi Yano/Lupin Red

Filmography

TV dramas

Films

References

External links
 
 

2000 births
Living people
Male actors from Tokyo